Balish Glacier is a glacier,  long, flowing north from the Soholt Peaks to enter Splettstoesser Glacier just northeast of Springer Peak, in the Heritage Range, Ellsworth Mountains. It was mapped by the United States Geological Survey from surveys and from U.S. Navy air photos, 1961–66, and was named by the Advisory Committee on Antarctic Names for Commander Daniel Balish, Executive Officer of U.S. Navy Squadron VX-6 during Operation Deep Freeze 1965, and Commanding Officer in 1967.

See also
 List of glaciers in the Antarctic
 Glaciology

References 

Glaciers of Ellsworth Land